Moti Magri ("Pearl hill") is a hill in India. It overlooks the Fateh Sagar Lake in the city of Udaipur, Rajasthan.

Atop the Moti Magri or Pearl Hill is the memorial of the Rajput hero Maharana Pratap, which has a bronze statue of the Maharana astride his favourite horse "Chetak".

Geography
It is located near the Fateh Sagar Lake on a small hillock.

History

Maharana Pratap Memorial was initiated in the twentieth century by Pratap sabha Maharana Bhupal singh of Mewar, which was carried over and completed with the help of a public trust.

References

Tourist attractions in Udaipur
Monuments and memorials in Rajasthan
Memorials to Maharana Pratap